Broken Head is the ninth studio album by Polish thrash metal band Acid Drinkers. It was released on 2 October 2000. The album was mixed at Larronerma Recording Institute in Poznań.

Track listing
All music composed by Acid Drinkers. All lyrics written by Titus, except "El Pecado" and "Red and Grey" written by Perła.

Bonus tracks

Personnel
Acid Drinkers
Tomek "Titus" Pukacki – vocals, bass, cover concept
Darek "Popcorn" Popowicz – lead guitar
Maciek "Ślimak" Starosta – drums, production, recording, mixing
Przemek "Perła" Wejmann – rhythm guitar, vocals on "El Pecado" and "Red and Grey", production, recording, mixing, cover concept

Production
Tomasz Dziubiński – production
Grzegorz Piwkowski – mastering
Jacek Chraplak – production, recording, mixing
Tomasz Mielcarz – photography

References

2000 albums
Acid Drinkers albums